Erlandsen is a surname. Notable people with the surname include:

Arne Erlandsen (born 1959), Norwegian football manager and former footballer
Christian Erlandsen (1926–2016), Norwegian physician and politician
Einar E. Erlandsen (1908–1995), American politician
Jakob Erlandsen (died 1274), Danish Roman Catholic archbishop
Maja Erlandsen (born 1989), Norwegian freestyle wrestler
Marius Erlandsen (born 1979), Norwegian auto racing driver
Otto Erlandsen (1867–1959), Swedish-American builder and architect